Norman Mitchell Driver (27 August 1918 – 19 March 2001), known professionally as Norman Mitchell, was an English television, stage and film actor.

Born in Sheffield, West Riding of Yorkshire, his father was a mining engineer and his mother a concert singer. He attended Carterknowle Grammar School and the University of Sheffield, before appearing in repertory theatre and with the Royal Shakespeare Company. During World War II he served with the Royal Army Medical Corps. He then made many television appearances and appeared in over sixty films.

Mitchell was married to actress Pauline Mitchell until her death in 1992. He was the father of Jacqueline Mitchell and actor Christopher Mitchell, known for his role in the BBC sitcom It Ain't Half Hot Mum. His son Christopher predeceased him by a month.

Selected filmography

 The Seekers (1954) - Grayson
 Up to His Neck (1954) - Fungus
 A Kid for Two Farthings (1955) - Stallholder (uncredited)
 Police Dog (1955)
 You Lucky People (1955) - Soldier (uncredited)
 Five Clues to Fortune (1957) - Bert
 Three Sundays to Live (1957) - Police Sergeant
 The Man Who Wouldn't Talk (1958) - (uncredited)
 Battle of the V-1 (1958) - German in Kübelwagen (uncredited)
 The Price of Silence (1960) - Landlord (uncredited)
 Beat Girl (1960) - Club Doorman
 This Sporting Life (1963) - Tenant (uncredited)
 The Yellow Teddy Bears (1963) - Larry
 West 11 (1963) - Shop Customer (uncredited)
 Carry On Cabby (1963) - Bespectacled Businessman (uncredited)
 Carry On Spying (1964) - Native Policeman / Algerian Gent
 Carry On Cleo (1964) - Heckler (uncredited)
 A Home of Your Own (1964) - The Foreman
 The Little Ones (1965) - (uncredited)
 You Must Be Joking! (1965) - Billingsgate Fish Porter (uncredited)
 Bunny Lake Is Missing (1965) - Mover
 Three Hats for Lisa (1965) - Truck driver
 Invasion (1965) - Lorry Driver
 The Great St Trinian's Train Robbery (1966) - William (Willy the Jelly-Man)
 I Was Happy Here (1966)
 Carry On Screaming! (1966) - Cabby
 The Jokers (1967) - Window Cleaner giving interview (uncredited)
 A Challenge for Robin Hood (1967) - Dray Driver
 Two a Penny (1967) - Attendant
 Half a Sixpence (1967) - Master of Ceremonies
 I'll Never Forget What's'isname (1967) - Party Guest (uncredited one-line spoken part)
 Oliver! (1968) - Arresting Policeman
 Diamonds for Breakfast (1968) - (uncredited)
 Two Gentlemen Sharing (1969) - Policeman
 Some Will, Some Won't (1970) - Policeman
 One More Time (1970) - Sergeant Smith
 The Games (1970) - Harry's Boss (uncredited)
 Atlantic Wall (1970) - Bobbie 1
 On the Buses (1971) - London Transport Official
 Bless This House (1972) - Police Sergeant
 Lady Caroline Lamb (1972) - Restaurant functionary
 Nearest and Dearest (1972) - Vernon Smallpiece
 And Now the Screaming Starts! (1973) - Constable
 Frankenstein and the Monster from Hell (1974) - Police Sergeant
 Man About the House (1974) - Arthur Mulgrove - Doorman
 Legend of the Werewolf (1975) - Tiny
 Barry Lyndon (1975) - British Soldier (uncredited)
 The Moon Over the Alley (1976) - Joe Tudge
 The Pink Panther Strikes Again (1976) - Mr. Bullock
 The Prince and the Pauper (1977) - Constable (uncredited)
 The Big Sleep (1978) - Doorman at Eddie's Club (uncredited)
 Carry On Emmannuelle (1978) - Drunken Husband
 A Hitch in Time (1978) - Police Sergeant (uncredited)
 The Return of the Soldier (1982) - Ernest
 The Wicked Lady (1983) - Man at Inn
 Revenge of Billy the Kid (1992) - Mr. Allott
 Dirty Weekend (1993) - Repair Man
 Lighthouse (1999) - Brownlow
 Meanwhile (2003) - the Landlord (final film role)

Selected television credits 

 Lorna Doone (1963) - Sergeant Bloxham
 No Cloak – No Dagger (1963) -  Police Sergeant
 The Saint (1962, Ep. #1-01) - Mr. Smith
 Gideon's Way (1964 - Ep. The Rhyme and the Reason) - Club Manager
 The Sullavan Brothers (1965) - Mr. Crisp
 Sherlock Holmes (1965) - Shinwell Johnson
 Doctor Who (in the serial The Daleks' Master Plan) (1965) - First Policeman
 Softly, Softly (1966-1969) - Steve / Dave Cullen
 Dad's Army (1969) - Captain Rogers
 Up Pompeii! (1970) - Stovus Primus
 Doctor at Large (1971) - Det. Sgt. Rowley
 On the Buses (1970-1971) - Nobby
 The Moonstone  (1972) - Mr. Ablewhite
 Whatever Happened to the Likely Lads? (1973-1974) - Jack / Barman / Pub Manager
 Z-Cars (1962-1977) - George Belling / Stanley Cook / Arnold Porter / PC Adams / Chizzy Black / 1st PC
 Beryl's Lot (1973-1977) - Charlie Mills
 No Strings (1974) - 1st Workman
 Thriller (1975) - 1st man in the pub
 Ripping Yarns (1977) - 1st Pressman
 It Ain't Half Hot Mum (1977) - Captain Owen
 Robin's Nest (1978) - Fred
 Come Back Mrs Noah (1978) - Mr. Noah
 Wodehouse Playhouse (1978) - P.C. Popjoy
 The Famous Five (1978) - Ben (the blacksmith)
 Danger UXB (1979) - ARP Man
 Sykes (1974-1979) - Leg Consultant
 George and Mildred (1976-1979) - Mr Clayton / Stanley / Ted / Pet Shop Assistant
 You're Only Young Twice (Series 3 - Episode Four - 21 June 1979) - "Use of Bath"- Landlord 
 Yes Minister (1980) - the Mayor
 We, the Accused (1980) - Crompton
 Why Didn't They Ask Evans? (1980) - Constable Browning
 The Goodies (1973) "The Lost Island of Munga" (ep 3.5)
 Worzel Gummidge (1979-1980) - P.C. Parsons
 Keep It in the Family (1980-1982) - Piano Mover / Burt
 Are You Being Served? (1978-1983) - Customer / Wendel P. Clark
 Never the Twain (1986-1988) - Waldo / George
 All Creatures Great and Small (1988) - Mr. Birtwhistle
 You Rang, M'Lord? (1993) - Perkins
 Casualty (1994) - Johno Jenkins
 Last of the Summer Wine'' (1998) - Coggy Duckworth

References

External links
 
 Interview British Entertainment History Project

1918 births
2001 deaths
English male film actors
English male stage actors
English male television actors
Male actors from Sheffield
Royal Army Medical Corps soldiers
British Army personnel of World War II